Firwood is an unincorporated community located in Klickitat, Washington, Washington, United States.  The community was settled in the early 1900s and was primarily an agricultural growing region.
Sometimes called the "FG Territory", Firwood includes the former King Ranch area to the south.

Unincorporated communities in Washington (state)
Unincorporated communities in Klickitat County, Washington